Manipogo Provincial Park is a provincial park on the shore of Lake Manitoba, approximately , northeast of Dauphin, Manitoba. It is named after Manipogo, a lake monster reputed to live in the lake.

The  location was declared a provincial park in 1961.

The park is located within the Waterhen ecodistrict of the Interlake Plain ecoregion, part of the Boreal Plains ecozone.

See also
List of protected areas of Manitoba
List of provincial parks in Manitoba

References

External links

A System Plan for Manitoba's Provincial Parks

Provincial parks of Manitoba
Parks in Parkland Region, Manitoba
Protected areas of Manitoba